Lydia Byam (baptized 1772) was a botanical illustrator known for her works depicting plants from the Caribbean.  Byam's career flourished during the period between 1797 and 1800. She published two works A collection of exotics, from the Island of Antigua (1797) and Fruits of the West Indies (1800) respectively. These are important for the role they played in garnering interest in botany of the Caribbean islands and the dietary and medicinal benefits they offered.

Family
Lydia Byam was born to parents William Byam (a lawyer and member of the Privy Council in Antigua, died and was buried in St. Georges, Antigua in 1779) and Martha Rogers (daughter of Edward Rogers). 
Lydia Byam was baptized on September 4, 1772 in Antigua and she died at sea, on an unknown date.

The prominence of the Byam family on the island of Antigua is clear from the will her father wrote, describing the extensive estate he owned. William Byam's will, dated March 1773, left his estate in Antigua, real & personal, to the first son Edward Byam, 4000 pounds to son Samuel Byam, and 3000 pounds to daughter Lydia Byam; his wife Martha was granted the house and lands in Pembrokshire and which was to be granted to Lydia at her death.

Her family tree going back to her great grandfather Edward Byam, who served as deputy or Lieutenant governor of Antigua from 1715-1741, further establishes the prominence of the Byam family in Antigua.

Works
The books were published anonymously with dedications and a dedication to her distant relative Elizabeth,  Viscountess Galway, the wife of Robert Monckton-Arundell, 4th Viscount Galway, the daughter of Daniel Mathew and Mary Byam.
 A collection of exotics, from the Island of Antigua (1797)
 Fruits of the West Indies (1800)

Gallery

See also
Maria Riddell

References 

18th-century British women artists
Antigua and Barbuda women illustrators
18th-century births
Year of death missing
18th-century British women scientists